Karadeniz Technical University ( or KTÜ) is a public research university in Trabzon, in the Black Sea Region of Turkey. Established in 1955, it is the fourth oldest university in Turkey. Karadeniz Technical University is a state university institution subject to the Law No. 2547 on Higher Education in Turkey. It is supported mainly by state funds allocated by the Turkish Parliament.

The university has 80 departments, 12 faculties and 6 graduate schools. With 2,159 teaching staff and 31,858 students, Karadeniz Technical University is one of the largest universities in Turkey.

History
Founded on 20 May 1955, Karadeniz Technical University (KTU) is the fourth oldest university in Turkey, and the first university established outside İstanbul and Ankara. After a period of eight years, on 19 September 1963, the faculties of Natural Sciences, Civil Engineering-Architecture, Mechanical and Electrical Engineering and Forestry, which are the foundation stone of today's Karadeniz Technical University, were established. Four months later, on 2 December 1963 the University began its educational activities. The campus site has been gradually expanding since then and, with many social, cultural and sports requirements met on site, it has turned into an outstanding site set in a green belt of woodlands and playing grounds, which makes it one of the best campus settings in the world.

Expansion of the university continued with the opening of faculties of Earth Sciences, and medicine in 1973. Twelve km away from the main campus, a new campus has been established where educational faculty with many departments in a variety of teaching fields has been set up. Karadeniz Technical University is still expanding with the introduction of new departments. Faculties of communication and dentistry are the most recent academic units established.

Language of instruction
Teaching language at Karadeniz Technical University is mainly Turkish. However, the increasing demand towards having courses in English has been taken into consideration by the administration. Recent developments include acceptance of new departments into Obligatory English Preparatory Programme before the commencement of the degree programme. Currently the students of first cycle degree programmes must show the required qualifications in English to be able to start the degree courses. All of the second and third cycle programmes have already been in this process for many years. In departments with English preparatory class, up to 30% of the courses are offered in English. Some of the postgraduate courses are also taught in English. A complete list of the courses and their teaching media is given in the information packages of each department.

For exchange students separate classes can be arranged in English should they ask for it. All the exchange students are encouraged to include a course of Basic Turkish Language in their learning agreement.

Campus

Main Campus (Kanuni)
Rectorate
Atatürk Culture Center
Faik Ahmet Barutçu Library
Faculty of Engineering
Faculty of Sciences
Faculty of Letters
Faculty of Architecture
Faculty of Forestry
Faculty of Economics and Administrative Sciences
Faculty of Medicine
Faculty of Health Sciences
Faculty of Dentistry
Faculty of Pharmacy
Faculty of Fine Arts
School of Foreign Languages
Heath Services Vocational Junior College
School of Tourism and Hospitality Job
Institute of Social Sciences
Institute of Science and Technology
Institute of Medical Sciences
Black Sea Research Institute
Institute of Forensic Sciences
Research centers
Trabzon School of Health Sciences

Fatih Campus
Fatih Education Faculty
Faculty of Communication
State Conservatory
Institute of Education Sciences
Trabzon Vocational School of Theology
Vocational Higher Education School of Physical Education and Sports

Akçaabat Campus
Faculty of Fine Arts
Trabzon Vocational College

Sürmene Campus
Sürmene Faculty of Marine Sciences
Abdullah Kanca Vocational Junior College

Muammer Dereli Campus
Sürmene Faculty of Marine Sciences, Maritime Transport - Department of Maritime Transport-Management Engineering

Beşikdüzü Campus
Beşikdüzü Vocational Junior College

Of Campus
Of Faculty of Technology

Vakfıkebir Campus
Vakfıkebir Vocational Junior College

Maçka Campus
Maçka Vocational Junior College

Arsin Campus
Arsin Vocational Junior College

Yalıncak Campus
Faculty of Theology

Coast Campus
Marine Science and Technology Institute 
Coastal Recreational Facilities

ECTS credit allocation
ECTS credits for each course included in a study programme was calculated based on true student workload. This includes:
setting up the objectives and learning outcomes of each course in the programme,
determining the activities to be carried out to achieve the outcomes on semester-basis,
estimating the in-class and out-class time required to complete these activities by 
(1) asking the course directors (lecturers / instructors),
(2) carrying out questionnaires with the successful students upon their completion of each course, and
(3) getting the average value excluding the outliers to achieve a more reliable estimate.
summing up the total times required for each course in the programme to determine the true workload for a semester, which is around 750–800 hours per semester considering 17 week- long term including the exam period.
distributing the calculated total time proportionally between each course to calculate its ECTS credit.
This gives about 25 hours of workload per ECTS credit. The student workload in the faculties of Medicine and especially Dentistry, however, is much higher than this value due to extensive laboratory and clinical exercises as well as dental model production exercises in the latter.

Academic recognition
As part of the integration into the European higher education area, Karadeniz Technical University ensures recognition of credits received in another higher education institution with which it has bilateral agreements, provided that the courses taken by the students are pre-agreed on by the departmental committee. Therefore, the students wishing to study abroad under the Erasmus+ programme are asked to get their learning agreements approved by their departments before application to the host institution. The signatures on the learning agreement assure the exchange students that their credits will be recognised and incorporated into their transcript of records as courses taken abroad. To ensure the recognition, the students are also asked to prepare a document of course equivalence in which the courses to be taken abroad and those they will be considered equal with after the mobility period are shown. This document, which is signed by the student and the members of the recognition committee of the department composed of the head of department, the Erasmus+ coordinator and the staff member responsible for course equivalence, and signed and stamped by the dean following a discussion in the faculty board, is a guarantor for the student in question showing that the courses to be taken abroad will be recognised as shown on the document.

If any changes are needed on the learning agreement, both the changes and the newly prepared equivalence document must be sent back to the home institution to follow the same track to be valid. Following the mobility period, the students are required to bring the transcript of records obtained from the host institution together with other documents such as learning agreement to the International Office which then gets in touch with the departmental coordinators to get the recognition process under the way. We make sure that the recognition is complete and all the courses passed by the student at the host institution are fully recognised by the department provided that they were pre-discussed and agreed up on by the student and the departmental recognition committee.

International Perspective 
The Best Global Universities Ranking of the U.S. News & World Report ranks KTU 1100th in the world and 574th in the subject area "Engineering" as of 2019.

In the recent Academic Ranking of World Universities 2018/2019, KTU is ranked at 201-300th in "Civil Engineering", 301-400th in "Mechanical Engineering", and 401-500th in "Chemical Engineering.

By CWTS Leiden Ranking 2019, KTU is ranked at 818th (overall), 681st in "Biomedical and Health Sciences", 596th in "Life and Earth Sciences", 690th in  "Mathematics and Computer Science" and 656th in "Physical Sciences and Engineering".

By URAP 2019, KTU is ranked at 1135th (overall), 756th in the broad subject area "Engineering", 378th in "Civil Engineering" and 897th in "Medical and Health Sciences".

Academics

Faculties
Source:
Faculty of Architecture
Faculty of Dentistry
Faculty of Economics and Administrative Sciences
Faculty of Engineering
Faculty of Forestry
Faculty of Marine Sciences
Faculty of Medicine
Faculty of Health Sciences
Faculty of Science
Faculty of Letters
Faculty of Technology

Colleges
Source:
Abdullah Kanca Vocational Junior College
Arsin Vocational Junior College
Beşikdüzü Vocational Junior College
Heath Services Vocational Junior College
Maçka Vocational Junior College
Trabzon Vocational College
Vakfıkebir Vocational Junior College
Vocational School of Tourism and Hotel Management

Institutions
Source:
Institute of Education Sciences
Institute of Health Sciences
Institute of Science and Technology
Institute of Social Sciences
Institute of Forensic Sciences
Black Sea Research Institute
Marine Science and Technology Institute

Research and application centers
Source:
History of Atatürk's Principles and Reforms
Computer Sciences
Computer Aided Design-Engineering and Production
Geographical Information Systems
Environmental Issues
Sea Ecology
Electronic Communication Systems
Hazelnut - Tea
Patient Rights
Landslide
Women 
Suleiman the Magnificent
Organ Transplant Education
Black Sea, Caucasus and Central Asian Studies
Materials Science and Production Technology
Preschool Education
Saadettin Güner Fuel
Forestry
Foreign Languages Teaching
Strategic Research
Continuing Education
Turkish Studies
Distance Education
Foreign Language Teaching

Affiliations
Since its establishment, Karadeniz Technical University has been heavily involved in international cooperation. Over the past few years, however, it has realised an enormous increase in international activities involving staff and student exchanges with universities in Japan, Central Asian Turkic republics, United States and many countries in Europe.

Karadeniz Technical University, which is one of the first universities in Turkey to join the Socrates-Erasmus program, matched with Gent University in Belgium, obtained Erasmus charter in 2003 (Charter No: 221082-IC-1-2003-1-TR-ERASMUS-EUCX-1). Since then, the number of bilateral agreements and the number of outgoing and incoming exchange students have increased steadily. The main aim is to receive as many students as we send abroad. Therefore, the university tries its utmost to help the incoming students to make their stay here exciting and rewarding. Believing that it may take quite a while for anyone to get used to the new environment, all incoming students are matched with a Turkish host whose role is to help his/her counterpart feel at home.

The university is a member of the Caucasus University Association.

Notable alumni

Şenol Güneş, football manager
Sani Şener, co-founder and CEO of TAV Airports Holding and TAV Construction
Nilüfer Çınar Çorlulu, Woman International Master (WIM) of chess
Kutbettin Arzu, former Minister of Food, Agriculture and Livestock
Adil Karaismailoğlu, Minister of Transport and Infrastructure
Mehmet Cahit Turhan, former Minister of Transport and Infrastructure
Mustafa Demir, former Minister of Public Works and Housing
Faruk Nafız Özak, former Minister of Public Works and Housing
Koray Aydın, former Minister of Public Works and Housing
Osman Pepe, former Minister of Environment and Forestry
Nazan Bekiroğlu, Turkish novelist and academician
Yasemin Özata Çetinkaya, civil servant 
Yakup Şener, Turkish boxer
Zeliha Şimşek, women's footballer and trainer
Fatih Keleş, European champion Turkish amateur boxer
Ragıp Eşref Filiz, author, poet and chief editor of sanalgaste.com.tr
Selçuk Aydın, European champion Turkish professional boxer
Meltem Akar, Turkish boxer
Necla Akdoğan, former women's footballer and referee

See also
List of forestry universities and colleges

Notes

 
1955 establishments in Turkey
Buildings and structures in Trabzon
Educational institutions established in 1955
Trabzon